Noctuides melanophia is a species of snout moth, and the type species in the genus Noctuides. It was described by Staudinger in 1892, and is known from Russia, Japan and Malaysia.

References

Moths described in 1892
Epipaschiinae
Moths of Japan